Janeshwar Mishra (5 August 1933 – 22 January 2010) was a politician from Samajwadi Party. He was a member of the Parliament of India and also represented Uttar Pradesh in the Rajya Sabha, the upper house of the Indian Parliament. He was known as Chhote Lohia (Lohia Junior) for his commitment towards socialist ideology, in reference to Ram Manohar Lohia.

Biography
He was born in Shubhanathahin (शुभनथहीं ) village in Ballia on 5 August 1933. He was B.A. and LL.B. He was president of the student union of Purna nand Inter College and attended Allahabad University as well. While still a student, he joined the Samajwadi Yuvajan Sabha and met Dr Ram Manohar Lohia and Raj Narain.

Lok Sabha
He represented the Allahabad Lok Sabha constituency three times. He first became the member of Lok Sabha by defeating K D Malviya, the sitting Petroleum Minister in Indira Gandhi Cabinet from Phulpur constituency in Allahabad district in 1969–70. Subsequently, he defeated V.P.Singh by almost 90,000 votes from Allahabad-Jamunapaar parliamentary constituency in 1977 elections. He served as a Member of Sixth Lok Sabha, 1977–80, and as Member of Ninth Lok Sabha, 1989–91.

Union Minister
He served in the governments of Morarji Desai, Chaudhary Charan Singh, V P Singh, Chandrashekhar, H D Deve Gowda and I K Gujral. He served as union minister of state from 1977. He also held portfolios of Petroleum, Water Resources Chemicals and Fertilisers, Energy, Shipping and Transport, and Communication and Railways. He served as the minister of state for Railways in the Chandra Shekhar government during 1990–91. He was Railways Minister in the Chandra Shekhar government in 1990–91.

Rajya Sabha
He was elected to Rajya Sabha in 1996. He was re-elected to Rajya Sabha in 2000   and 2006.

Death
He died due to cardiac arrest on 22 January 2010 at Tej Bahadur Sapru Hospital in Allahabad.  At the time of death, he was the Samajwadi Party's vice president and member of the Rajya Sabha. He is survived by two daughters, one of them being Mina Tiwari.

Influence
Former Chief Minister of Uttar Pradesh, Akhilesh Yadav credits Janeshwar Mishra with initiating him into politics.

References

External links
 Profile on Rajya Sabha website

1933 births
2010 deaths
Samajwadi Party politicians
Samyukta Socialist Party politicians
Janata Dal politicians
Rajya Sabha members from Uttar Pradesh
India MPs 1967–1970
People from Ballia district
V. P. Singh administration
India MPs 1977–1979
India MPs 1989–1991
India MPs 1971–1977
Lok Sabha members from Uttar Pradesh
Samajwadi Janata Party politicians
People from Allahabad district
Bharatiya Lok Dal politicians
Janata Party politicians
Lok Dal politicians